The Greek Military Police, generally known in Greek by the acronym ESA, was the military police branch of the Hellenic Army in the years 1951–1974. It developed into a powerful paramilitary organization and a stronghold of right-wing, conservative Army officers. It became the main security (secret police) and intelligence organization during the Greek military junta of 1967–1974. After the fall of the junta and the restoration of democracy in 1974, it was disbanded because of its brutal practices, which included the widespread use of torture.

Since 1974, the Hellenic Army maintains a military police section called Stratonomia, but its powers are far less extensive than those of ESA.

Establishment
The ESA was established in 1951, as Greece was preparing to join NATO. Up until then, the Greek Army did not have a specialized military police force. Being posted in the ESA was a major bonus for Army officers because it had very extensive powers within the military, even before the dictatorship. Both the officers and the soldiers who served in ESA were picked for their extreme, almost paranoid, anti-communism. This resulted in making ESA a bastion of the most conservative and anti-democratic members of the Greek officer corps. ESA men wore a distinctive uniform with a royal blue cap (the soldiers wore a beret at the time), golden lanyard on their right shoulder and an armband with the letters ESA around their left arm.

During the Junta
In April 1967, shortly after seizing power in a coup, junta leader George Papadopoulos appointed Dimitrios Ioannides chief of the ESA, which gradually had been transformed into an internal security army.

When Papadopoulos declared Martial law after the 1967 coup, he increased the power of the ESA even further by making it the junta's chief arm of law and order as well as repression. Under Ioannides, ESA rose to a force of more than 20,000 men.

Thousands of the junta's political opponents were arrested by the ESA and sent to some of the Aegean's most desolate islands, called the prison islands. Many of the allegations of prisoner torture under the Papadopoulos regime involved the ESA, in particular its Special Investigative Section (tr. Eidikón Anakritikón Tmíma), commonly known in its abbreviated form as ΕAT or EAT/ESA.

Use of torture chambers by ESA during interrogations was reported during the Greek military junta years. Alexandros Panagoulis was one example of a person tortured at the EAT/ESA interrogation cell units. Greek politician Nikos Konstantopoulos is another example. Army Major Spyros Moustaklis was left brain damaged and unable to speak after the torture he endured at EAT/ESA.

Alarmed at moves Papadopoulos was making towards a transition to democratic rule, loannidis used his position and power as ESA chief to oust him from power.

The ESA was disbanded in 1974 by Constantine Karamanlis and its leading members involved in torture were court-martialled and sentenced during the Greek junta trials, although many served only token prison terms.

Members
Research based on interviews with 21 former ESA members shows that all had been men had been drafted, first into regular military service and then into the ESA. Carried out by Janice T. Gibson and Mika Haritos-Fatouros, the research also showed that recruits underwent series of rigorous treatments and training over a matter of months in order to prepare them psychologically for the task of torturing detainees.

Buildings
The headquarters of the Special Interrogation Sections of the Military Police (EAT-ESA) was in a building which now houses the Eleftherios Venizelos Museum at Eleftherias Park, Vassilissis Sofias Avenue in Athens.

Operating doctrine
According to witnesses at the court martial proceedings, ESA's operating doctrine was:
"Those who enter here, exit either as friends or as cripples."

In popular culture
 Yannis Smaragdis’ 1975 film Cell Zero focuses on the violence and torture carried out at the EAT/ESA headquarters, examining the impact of the Greek junta on a group of people with differing political convictions.

After 1974

Law 276/76 renamed ESA simply to "Military Police" (Στρατονομία, Stratonomia).

Corresponding organizations exist also for the other two branches of the Greek armed forces: for the Hellenic Air Force (Αερονομία, Aeronomia), founded in 1945 as "Greek Air Force Police" (Ἑλληνική Ἀεροπορικὴ Ἀστυνομία, EAA), and for the Hellenic Navy (Ναυτονομία, Naftonomia, properly Υπηρεσία Ναυτονομίας or Y.NΑ.).

These three forces work together often but are independent from each other. Most of the personnel are draftee soldiers undergoing their regular military service.

Citations and notes

See also
 Military police
 Your Neighbor's Son

External links
 Google Translation of Vice Admiral Dimitriades' interview TV series: Reportage without frontiers (From ET Greek National TV)
 To Vima interview with Nikos Konstantopoulos (Translation by Google)

Greek junta
Political repression in Greece
Secret police
Defunct law enforcement agencies of Greece
Military Police